Benjamin Mitchell and Jordan Thompson are the defending champions, but only Mitchell defending his title partnering Matthew Barton .

Mitchell and Barton withdrew before their quarterfinal match with third seeds Li Ze and Peng Hsien-yin .

Gong Maoxin and Yi Chu-huan won the title, defeating Go Soeda and Yasutaka Uchiyama in the final 6–3, 7–6(9–7) .

Seeds

Draw

References
 Main Draw

Shimadzu All Japan Indoor Tennis Championships - Doubles
2016 Doubles